Doonmore is a promontory fort and National Monument located in County Kerry, Ireland.

Location

History 

Traditionally viewed as being built by the Iron Age Veneti, promontory forts are now associated with a later date, the early Middle Ages. (5th–8th centuries AD).

Structure

References

Buildings and structures in County Kerry
Tourist attractions in County Kerry
National Monuments in County Kerry